Maha Ganapati Temple of Arizona is a Hindu Temple located in Maricopa, Arizona. It is one of many temples that serves the Hindu Population of the Phoenix Metropolitan Area. It is also within two hour driving distance from Tucson, Arizona. Nestled in a remote location away from the traffic it offers a quite location for the devotees. The temple is part of Harvard University Pluralism Project, a project dedicated to cataloging all Religious bodies in the United States.

Although Maha Ganapati is the main feature of the this temple it houses multiple altars for many of the popular Hindu deities.  In addition to daily Pujas/services it offers special services marking major Hindu holidays.

History
In 1999, Satguru Sivaya Subramuniyaswami of Kauai Aadheenam gifted a 1400 lb, 4 ft tall statue of Ganesh as a Murti for a new Hindu Temple to be constructed in Arizona. In November 2000, The Maha Ganapati Temple of Arizona was officially established as a Non-Profit Organization and recognized as a religious organization. In 2002, 15 acres of land and a double sided trailer in Maricopa was donated to the organization by Gunnela Family. MGT Arizona later held its grand opening ceremony with 500 devotees attending. Between 2002 and 2007, 500,000 dollars was raised for the initial phase of the project. On August 25, 2007, the groundbreaking of the 8000 sq foot temple began. The first phase of building would be estimated to cost 1.5 Million dollars. four Towers were constructed with the highest one reaching 26 feet. Phase 1 finished in May 2008, and a Prana Pratishtha was held for the Murtis installed. In 2010, 250,000 dollars was raised by the 1,000 followers of the temple to construct additional murtis and towers for the temple. In 2011, 4 additional murtis of Hindu deities were installed and in 2012, sculptors were brought in to sculpt Indian art work into the interior and exterior of the building. In 2014, the temple finished sculpting its 4 towers with Indian Art Work. MGT Arizona attended an interfaith dialogue and religious diversity event in Chandler in 2012, reciting a prayer for the attendees. Henry Cejudo attended the event.

References

Buildings and structures in Maricopa County, Arizona
Hinduism in the United States
Religious buildings and structures completed in 2008
Religious organizations established in 2000
2000 establishments in Arizona
Asian-American culture in Arizona
Indian-American culture in Arizona